Akeley is a surname. Notable people with the surname include:

Carl Akeley (1864–1926), American naturalist, inventor, sculptor and photographer
Delia Akeley (1875–1970), American explorer
Kurt Akeley (born 1958), American computer graphics engineer
Mary Jobe Akeley (1886–1966), American naturalist and explorer